The Amoy dialect or Xiamen dialect, also known as Amoynese, Amoy Hokkien, Xiamenese or Xiamen Hokkien, is a dialect of Hokkien spoken in the city of Xiamen (historically known as "Amoy") and its surrounding metropolitan area, in the southern part of Fujian province. Currently, it is one of the most widely researched and studied varieties of Southern Min. It has historically come to be one of the more standardized varieties. 

Amoynese and Taiwanese are both historically mixtures of Quanzhou and Zhangzhou dialects. As such, they are very closely aligned phonologically. There are some differences between the two, especially lexical, as a result of physical separation and the differing histories of mainland China and Taiwan during the 20th century. Amoynese and Taiwanese are mutually intelligible. Intelligibility with other Hokkien, especially inland, is more difficult. By that standard, Amoynese and Taiwanese may be considered dialects of a single language. Ethnolinguistically, however, Amoynese is part of mainland Hokkien.

History 
In 1842, as a result of the signing of the Treaty of Nanking, Amoy was designated as a trading port in Fujian. Amoy and Kulangsu rapidly developed, which resulted in a large influx of people from neighboring areas such as Quanzhou and Zhangzhou. The mixture of these various accents formed the basis for the Amoy dialect.

Over the last several centuries, a large number of Southern Fujianese people from these same areas migrated to Taiwan during Dutch and Qing rule. The "Amoy dialect" was considered the vernacular of Taiwan. Eventually, the mixture of accents spoken in Taiwan became popularly known as Taiwanese during Imperial Japanese rule. As in American and British English, there are subtle lexical and phonological differences between modern Taiwanese and Amoy Hokkien; however, these differences do not generally pose any barriers to communication. Amoy dialect speakers also migrated to Southeast Asia, mainly in the Philippines (where it is known as Lán-nâng-ōe), Indonesia, Malaysia and Singapore.

Special characteristics
The spoken Amoy dialect preserves many of the sounds and words from Old Chinese. However, the vocabulary of Amoy was also influenced in its early stages by the Minyue languages spoken by the ancient Minyue peoples. Spoken Amoy is known for its extensive use of nasalization.

Unlike Mandarin, the Amoy dialect distinguishes between voiced and voiceless unaspirated initial consonants (Mandarin has no voicing of initial consonants). Unlike English, it differentiates between unaspirated and aspirated voiceless initial consonants (as Mandarin does too). In less technical terms, native Amoy speakers have little difficulty in hearing the difference between the following syllables:

However, these fully voiced consonants did not derive from the Early Middle Chinese voiced obstruents, but rather from fortition of nasal initials.

Accents 

A comparison between Amoy and other Southern Min languages can be found there.

Tones 
Amoy is similar to other Southern Min variants in that it makes use of five tones, though only two in checked syllables. The tones are traditionally numbered from 1 through 8, with 4 and 8 being the checked tones, but those numbered 2 and 6 are identical in most regions.

Tone sandhi 
Amoy has extremely extensive tone sandhi (tone-changing) rules: in an utterance, only the last syllable pronounced is not affected by the rules. What an 'utterance' is, in the context of this language, is an ongoing topic for linguistic research. For the purpose of this article, an utterance may be considered a word, a phrase, or a short sentence. The diagram illustrates the rules that govern the pronunciation of a tone on each of the syllables affected (that is, all but the last in an utterance):

Literary and colloquial readings 
Like other languages of Southern Min, Amoy has complex rules for literary and colloquial readings of Chinese characters. For example, the character for big/great, 大, has a vernacular reading of tōa, but a literary reading of tāi. Because of the loose nature of the rules governing when to use a given pronunciation, a learner of Amoy must often simply memorize the appropriate reading for a word on a case by case basis. For single-syllable words, it is more common to use the vernacular pronunciation. This situation is comparable to the on and kun readings of the Japanese language.

The vernacular readings are generally thought to predate the literary readings, as is the case with the Min Chinese varieties; the literary readings appear to have evolved from Middle Chinese. The following chart illustrates some of the more commonly seen sound shifts:

Vocabulary 
 For further information, read the article: Swadesh list

The Swadesh word list, developed by the linguist Morris Swadesh, is used as a tool to study the evolution of languages. It contains a set of basic words which can be found in every language.

The Amoy Min Nan Swadesh list
The Sinitic Swadesh lists (Standard Mandarin, Sichuanese, Nanjingnese, Cantonese, Yuetai Hakka, Amoynese Hokkien, Hokchiu, Shanghainese, Suzhounese, Changshanese)

Phonology

Initials 

 Word-initial alveolar consonants  when occurring before  are pronounced as alveo-palatal sounds .
 can fluctuate freely in initial position as either a flap or voiced stop , .
 can occur in both word initial and final position.
 when occurring before  can be pronounced as voiceless sounds , .

Finals

 Final consonants are pronounced as unreleased .

Grammar 
Amoy grammar shares a similar structure to other Chinese dialects, although it is slightly more complex than Mandarin. Moreover, equivalent Amoy and Mandarin particles are usually not cognates.

Complement constructions 
Amoy complement constructions are roughly parallel to Mandarin ones, although there are variations in the choice of lexical term. The following are examples of constructions that Amoy employs.

In the case of adverbs:

Mandarin: tā pǎo de kuài (他跑得快)

In the case of the adverb "very":

Mandarin: tā pǎo de	hěn kuài (他跑得很快)

Mandarin: tā pǎo bù kuài (他跑不快)

Mandarin: tā kàn de dào (他看得到)

For the negative,

Mandarin: tā kàn bù dào (他看不到)

For the adverb "so," Amoy uses kah (甲) instead of Mandarin de (得):

Mandarin: tā xià de huà dōu shuō bù chūlái (他嚇得話都說不出來)

Negative particles 

Negative particle syntax is parallel to Mandarin about 70% of the time, although lexical terms used differ from those in Mandarin. For many lexical particles, there is no single standard Hanji character to represent these terms (e.g. m̄, a negative particle, can be variously represented by 毋, 呣, and 唔), but the most commonly used ones are presented below in examples. The following are commonly used negative particles:

 m̄ (毋/伓) - is not + noun (Mandarin 不, bù)
 i m̄-sī gún lāu-bú. (伊毋是阮老母) "She is not my mother."
 m̄ (毋/伓) - does not/will not + verb (Mandarin 不, bù)
 i m̄ lâi. (伊毋來) "He will not come."
 verb + bōe (袂/𣍐 (⿰勿會)) + particle - is not able to (Mandarin 不, bù)
 góa khòaⁿ-bōe-tio̍h. (我看袂著) "I am not able to see it."
 bōe (袂/𣍐 (⿰勿會)) + helping verb - cannot (opposite of ē 會, "is able to") (Mandarin 不, bù)
 i bōe-hiáu kóng Eng-gú. (伊袂曉講英語) "He can't speak English."
 helping verbs that go with bōe (袂)
bōe-sái (袂使) - is not permitted to (Mandarin 不可以 bù kěyǐ)
bōe-hiáu (袂曉) - does not know how to (Mandarin 不會, búhuì)
bōe-tàng (袂當) - not able to (Mandarin 不能, bùnéng)
 mài (莫/勿愛) - do not (imperative) (Mandarin 別, bié)
 mài kóng! (莫講) "Don't speak!"
 bô (無) - do not + helping verb (Mandarin 不, bù)
 i bô beh lâi. (伊無欲來) "He is not going to come."
 helping verbs that go with bô (無):
beh (欲) - want to + verb; will + verb
ài (愛) - must + verb
èng-kai (應該) - should + verb
kah-ì (合意) - like to + verb
 bô (無) - does not have (Mandarin 沒有, méiyǒu)
 i bô chîⁿ. (伊無錢) "He does not have any money."
 bô (無) - did not (Mandarin 沒有, méiyǒu)
 i bô lâi. (伊無來) "He did not come."
 bô (無) - is not + adjective (Mandarin 不, bù)
 i bô súi. (伊無媠/水) "She is not beautiful."
hó (好) ("good") is an exception, as it can use both m̄ and bô.

Common particles 
Commonly seen particles include:
與 (hō·) - indicates passive voice (Mandarin 被, bèi)
i hō· lâng phiàn khì (伊與人騙去) - "They were cheated"
共 (kā) - identifies the object (Mandarin 把, bǎ)
i kā chîⁿ kau hō· lí (伊共錢交與你) - "He handed the money to you"
加 (ke) - "more"
i ke chia̍h chi̍t óaⁿ (伊加食一碗) - "He ate one more bowl"
共 (kā) - identifies the object
góa kā lí kóng (我共你講) - "I'm telling you"
濟 (chōe) - "more"
i ū khah chōe ê pêng-iú (伊有較濟的朋友) - "He has comparatively many friends"

Romanization 
A number of Romanization schemes have been devised for Amoy. Pe̍h-ōe-jī is one of the oldest and best established. However, the Taiwanese Language Phonetic Alphabet has become the romanization of choice for many of the recent textbooks and dictionaries from Taiwan.

See also 

Amoy
Southern Min
Hokkien
Quanzhou & Zhangzhou
Taiwanese
Penang Hokkien
Medan Hokkien
Lan-nang
Written Hokkien
Holopedia
Speak Hokkien Campaign
Languages of China
Languages of Taiwan
Languages of Singapore
List of prestige dialects
Amoy Min Nan Swadesh list
Sino-Tibetan Swadesh lists

References

Sources

External links 

 {Why it is Called Amoy}, Why Minnan is called "Amoy"
 listen to the news in Amoy Min Nan (site is in Chinese script)
 Database of Pronunciations of Chinese Dialects (in English, Chinese and Japanese)
 Glossika - Chinese Languages and Dialects
 Voyager - Spacecraft - Golden Record - Greetings From Earth - Amoy, includes translation and sound clip
 (The voyager clip says)

Hokkien-language dialects
City colloquials
Xiamen